The Roman Catholic Diocese of Bereina is  a suffragan diocese of the Roman Catholic Archdiocese of Port Moresby. It was erected Vicariate Apostolic in 1959 and elevated to a diocese in 1966.

Bishops

Ordinaries
Eugène Klein, M.S.C. (1960–1971), appointed Coadjutor Archbishop of Nouméa, New Caledonia
Louis Vangeke, M.S.C. (1976–1979) 
Benedict To Varpin (1979–1987), appointed Coadjutor Archbishop of Madang
Luke Paul Matlatarea, M.S.C. (1988–1998) 
Gérard-Joseph Deschamps, S.M.M. (1999–2002)
John Ribat, M.S.C. (2002–2007), appointed Coadjutor Archbishop of Port Moresby; future Cardinal
Rochus Tatamai, M.S.C. (2007–2018), appointed Bishop of Kavieng
Otto Separy (2019–present)

Auxiliary bishop
John Ribat, M.S.C. (2000–2002), appointed Bishop here; future Cardinal

Coat of arms 
The new coat of arms of the Diocese was adopted in 2016. The proposal of coat of arms created Marek Sobola, a heraldic artist from Slovakia.

External links and references

References

Bereina